The Glide automobile was an American automobile manufactured by the Bartholomew Company in Peoria Heights, Illinois beginning in 1902. Founded by John B. Bartholomew, the company continued to produce automobiles until 1920, when the company began manufacturing trucks for the Avery Company, of which Bartholomew was also president.

Company origins

J. B. Bartholomew started with the Avery Company in Galesburg, Illinois on December 8, 1879 driving a team to haul lumber for a US$1.10 per day. In 1882 the Avery company purchased  in Peoria, Illinois and moved the business there to North Adams and North Jefferson Streets. In 1892, Robert Avery, the president of the Avery Co., died and Bartholomew was made vice-president.

He had for the prior ten years been in Des Moines, Iowa, managing one of the Avery Co. plants, and where he also built up a small side business, the Bartholomew Company, to manufacture popcorn and peanut roasters and wagons. Upon his return to Peoria to become vice president of the Avery Company, he continued his side business. In 1900, he moved the company's manufacturing facility to a new facility on the 300-500 block of Glide Avenue in Peoria.

Models produced

In 1901 Batholomew began experimenting with automobile manufacturing, and in 1902 he added automobiles to the Bartholomew Company production line. Their slogan was "Ride in a Glide, Then Decide." They made a total of seven models, though never more than 500 cars in a year, and usually less. The first car was a  single-cylinder tiller-steered runabout named the Glidemobile. The engine was positioned horizontally under the seat, featured a single chain-drive and an optional tonneau top. The two-seater sold for US$750, and the tonneau top for US$850. About 25 were sold in 1903 and twice that in 1904.

In 1905 they introduced a 14 hp 2-cylinder engine and in 1906 a 36 hp 4-cylinder front-mounted engine. They stopped making single- and two-cylinder engines in 1906, and in 1907 they added a 50/60 hp 6-cylinder Model H. This was mounted on a  wheelbase and sold for US$3500. In 1908, the company stock was worth $200,000. The cars were sold through dealers in Des Moines, New Orleans, Boston, San Francisco, New York City, Butte (Montana), Washington D.C., Indianapolis, Allegheny (Pennsylvania), Wausau (Wisconsin) and Montreal.

The Model H was made for only two years, and from 1909-1915 the cars featured a 4-cylinder,  engine, shaft drive, and several bodies including roadster or tourer makes. They began offering a closed car for the first time in 1916, when they also returned to offering a 6-cylinder engine. They produced about 200 cars per year, until 1916 when this rose to about 500 autos. The new Model 6-40 offered a smaller  engine than the Model H, on a  wheelbase. This sold for US$1095 as a tourer body and US$1295 as a sedan. This model remained largely the same through 1920.

Absorbed into Avery Company
 
In 1920, as competition from Buick and Studebaker increased, Bartholomew decided to bring the plant into the Avery Company fold and it was utilized to manufacture trucks. Avery Company employed four thousand people by this point, but went into bankruptcy and receivership in 1923. President J. B. Bartholomew died in 1924.

References

See also
List of automobile manufacturers
List of defunct United States automobile manufacturers

Vintage vehicles
Motor vehicle manufacturers based in Illinois
Defunct motor vehicle manufacturers of the United States
Companies based in Peoria County, Illinois